Synchlora aerata, the wavy-lined emerald moth or camouflaged looper, is a species of moth of the family Geometridae. The species was described by Johan Christian Fabricius in 1798. It is found in most of North America.

The wingspan is about 17 mm. Adults are green with scalloped or wavy white transverse lines.

The larvae feed on a wide variety of plants, including the flower heads of composite flowers and other flowering plants, as well as shrubs and trees. Recorded food plants include Aster, Rudbeckia, Liatris, Solidago, Artemisia, Achillea and Rubus species. They attach bits of the plant tissue on which they are feeding along their backs. The species overwinters as a partially grown larva.

Subspecies
Synchlora aerata aerata (Georgia, Alabama, Mississippi, Texas, Oklahoma, South Carolina, Arkansas, New Hampshire, New York, Vermont, southern Ontario, Michigan, Wisconsin, Iowa, Maryland)
Synchlora aerata albolineata Packard, 1873 (from Newfoundland to Alberta and south to Minnesota, Wisconsin, New York, Maine, New England, Massachusetts, northern Connecticut. It is also found in southern Manitoba)
Synchlora aerata liquoraria Guenée, 1857 (from California, Arizona and New Mexico to British Columbia and Alberta. It is also found in South Dakota)

References

External links
 Image of larva attaching pieces of flower to its back

Moths described in 1798
Synchlorini